SS Tiger was a tanker that was torpedoed on 1 April 1942 off the coast of Virginia during World War II.

Tiger was an American Socony-Vacuum Oil Company tanker completed in 1917 at San Francisco, California. Tiger was carrying  of Navy fuel oil when the German submarine  torpedoed her on 1 April 1942. The torpedo hit Tiger on her starboard side aft of amidships tank #5 and one crewman lost his life.

References

Shipwrecks of the Virginia coast
World War II shipwrecks in the Atlantic Ocean
Ships sunk by German submarines in World War II
Maritime incidents in April 1942
Ships built in San Francisco
1917 ships